Alytus is a railway station in Lithuania. It opened in 1899.

References 

Railway stations in Lithuania
Railway stations in the Russian Empire opened in 1899